3063 Makhaon  is a large Jupiter trojan from the Greek camp, approximately  in diameter. It was discovered on 4 August 1983, by Soviet astronomer Lyudmila Karachkina at the Crimean Astrophysical Observatory in Nauchnij, on the Crimean peninsula. The dark D-type asteroid is the principal body of the proposed Makhaon family and belongs to the 20 largest Jupiter trojans having a rotation period of 8.6 hours. It was named after the legendary healer Machaon from Greek mythology.

Orbit and classification 

Makhaon is a dark Jovian asteroid orbiting in the leading Greek camp at Jupiter's  Lagrangian point, 60° ahead of its orbit in a 1:1 resonance (see Trojans in astronomy).

It orbits the Sun at a distance of 4.9–5.5 AU once every 11 years and 11 months (4,345 days; semi-major axis of 5.21 AU). Its orbit has an eccentricity of 0.06 and an inclination of 12° with respect to the ecliptic. The body's observation arc begins with a precovery taken at Lowell Observatory in February 1931, more than 52 years prior to its official discovery observation at Nauchnij.

Makhaon family 

Fernando Roig and Ricardo Gil-Hutton identified Makhaon as the principal body of a small Jovian asteroid family, using the hierarchical clustering method (HCM), which looks for groupings of neighboring asteroids based on the smallest distances between them in the proper orbital element space. According to the astronomers, the Makhaon family belongs to the larger Menelaus clan, an aggregation of Jupiter trojans which is composed of several families, similar to the Flora family in the inner asteroid belt.

However this family is not included in David Nesvorný HCM-analysis from 2014. Instead, Makhaon is listed as a non-family asteroid of the Jovian background population on the Asteroids Dynamic Site (AstDyS) which based on another analysis by Milani and Knežević.

Naming 

This minor planet was named from Greek mythology after the legendary healer Machaon, a physician to the Greek troops during the Trojan War as mentioned in Homer's Iliad. He is the son of Asclepius and Epione and brother of Hygieia, Podalirius (who was also a physician) and Panacea. The official  was published by the Minor Planet Center on 26 March 1986.

Physical characteristics 

In both the Tholen- and SMASS-like taxonomy of the Small Solar System Objects Spectroscopic Survey (S3OS2), Makhaon is a dark D-type asteroid, the most common spectral type among the Jupiter trojans. It is also an assumed C-type asteroid with a V–I color index of 0.83, lower than most larger D-types. It has a B–R magnitude of 1.23 –the difference in magnitude between the blue and red filter – indicating a spectra redder than that of the Sun, which has a B–R mag of 1.03.

Rotation period 

Several rotational lightcurves of Makhaon have been obtained since its first photometric observation by Richard Binzel in 1988. It gave a rotation period of 17.3 hours. In November 2009, French amateur astronomer René Roy measured a period of 2.6 hours from a fragmentary lightcurve based on a single-night observation.().

Italian astronomer Stefano Mottola reported a period of 8.6354 and 8.648 taken from observation at La Silla Observatory, Chile, in June 1994, and from Calar Alto Observatory, Spain, in December 2009 with a low brightness variation of 0.06 and 0.09, respectively.

In December 2010 and April 2014, follow-up observations by Daniel Coley in collaboration with Robert Stephens at the Center for Solar System Studies and the Goat Mountain Astronomical Research Station  rendered a period of 8.64 and 8.45 hours and an amplitude of 0.15 magnitude. The result shows that Binzel's first measurement was probably an alternative period solution (i.e. twice the actual period).

In February 2013, Michael Alkema at the Elephant Head Observatory  in Arizona reported a concurring period of 8.639 hours with a brightness variation of 0.08 magnitude.

Diameter and albedo 

According to the surveys carried out by the Infrared Astronomical Satellite IRAS, the Japanese Akari satellite and the NEOWISE mission of NASA's Wide-field Infrared Survey Explorer, Makhaon measures between 111.65 and 116.14 kilometers in diameter and its surface has an albedo between 0.0476 and 0.056. The Collaborative Asteroid Lightcurve Link derives an albedo of 0.0569 and a diameter of 116.35 kilometers based on an absolute magnitude of 8.4.

Notes

References

External links 
 Asteroid Lightcurve Database (LCDB), query form (info )
 Dictionary of Minor Planet Names, Google books
 Asteroids and comets rotation curves, CdR – Observatoire de Genève, Raoul Behrend
 Discovery Circumstances: Numbered Minor Planets (1)-(5000) – Minor Planet Center
 
 

003063
Discoveries by Lyudmila Karachkina
Named minor planets
19830804